Samuil Lazarevič  Ronin (1894–?) was a Soviet social scientist. He took party in the Soviet Union delegations to the World Social Economy Congress in the Netherlands, 1931.

In 1962 he wrote a pamphlet with I. P. Tsamerian entitled Equality of Rights between Races and Nationalities in the USSR. When it was published by UNESCO, the accuracy of the pamphlet was disputed by The Spectator.

References

1894 births
Soviet scientists
Year of death missing